Utharomyces is a fungal genus in the family Pilobolaceae. The genus is monotypic, containing the single coprophilous (dung-loving) species Utharomyces epallocaulus, which is widely distributed in subtropical regions. Utharomyces was circumscribed by the Dutch botanist Karel Bernard Boedijn in 1958. U. epallocaulus has been collected in Bahamas, Ghana, India, Indonesia, Mexico, China, and the United States.

References

Fungi of Africa
Fungi of Asia
Fungi of North America
Taxa described in 1958
Monotypic fungi genera
Zygomycota genera
Taxa named by Karel Bernard Boedijn